Events in the year 1903 in Venezuela.

Incumbents
President: Cipriano Castro

Events
January 17 - Venezuela Crisis of 1902-1903: Bombardment of Fort San Carlos

Births

Deaths

References